Hindley Earnshaw is a fictional character in Emily Brontë's 1847 novel Wuthering Heights. Hindley is the brother of Catherine Earnshaw, father of Hareton Earnshaw, and the foster brother and sworn enemy of Heathcliff. He descends into a life of drunkenness, degradation, and misery after his wife Frances dies from consumption, shortly after childbirth. This enables Heathcliff to seek revenge on him for his cruelty towards him in his childhood years.

Story
Hindley begins to view Heathcliff as his rival when Mr. Earnshaw, his father, brings the orphaned boy home and raises him as his own. Jealous of Heathcliff's closeness to Mr. Earnshaw, Hindley instantly treats Heathcliff with animosity and abuse. Eventually, this gives way to Mr. Earnshaw favoring Heathcliff as his favorite child, above his son Hindley and daughter Catherine, causing Hindley to hate his "foster-brother" even more. His father then, with the advice of others, sets him to go off to college. After Mr. Earnshaw dies, Hindley returns home to the funeral with a wife, Frances. Nelly Dean suggests that Frances is most likely a woman with, "neither money nor name to recommend her, or he would scarcely have kept the union from his father." When she begins to dislike Heathcliff, Hindley sees it as his chance to validate his long felt anger, jealousy, and resentment towards Heathcliff and degrade Heathcliff by making him a servant at Wuthering Heights, forcing him to work relentlessly.

Hindley's cruelty causes Heathcliff to entertain thoughts of avenging himself upon Hindley, as he tells Nelly Dean that he would love to "paint the housefront with Hindley's blood!" When Frances dies after giving birth to baby Hareton, Hindley becomes "tyrannical and evil" and begins to drink heavily. He rapidly begins to curse, gamble, and declare mad, coarse ravings. He even comes close to killing his own son, Hareton, although Heathcliff accidentally saves the infant child. Hindley later regrets this action, and decides to fire Heathcliff as opposed to continue to beat him. After Heathcliff mysteriously disappears for three years, he returns to see Hindley worse than ever, and sees it as a chance to take revenge on his lifelong enemy. It becomes apparent that Hindley gambles away every bit of money he has to Heathcliff, and that the mortgage of Wuthering Heights goes entirely to Heathcliff, thus enabling him to become the owner of the house that had always belonged to the Earnshaw family, dating back to the year 1500 as stated in the beginning of the novel.

Although Hindley descends into a life of alcoholic madness, Catherine dies before him. He attempts to keep himself sober for the funeral, but, unable to contain himself, drinks heavily in front of the fire and ends up attempting to murder Heathcliff, which Heathcliff's wife Isabella prevents from happening. Eventually however, the two get into a brawl once again the following morning, and after Isabella escapes Wuthering Heights, Hindley shuts himself in a room, humiliated from being physically beaten by Heathcliff after years of being his master, and drinks himself to death.

Description
Hindley has long, brown hair, and the dark, famous "Earnshaw eyes," which also belong to Catherine Earnshaw, Catherine Linton, and Hareton. When he comes home from college, he is apparently a greatly altered man in dress and aspect. He had grown "sparer, and had lost his colour, and spoke and dressed quite differently." At Frances's death, however, he descends into a life of misery, depravity, and insanity:

For himself, he grew desperate: his sorrow was of that kind that will not lament. He neither wept, nor prayed; he cursed and defied; execrated God and man, and gave himself up to reckless dissipation. The servants could not bear his tyrannical and evil conduct long. Joseph and I were the only two that would stay. - Nelly Dean's description of Hindley, after the death of Frances Earnshaw

References

Characters in Wuthering Heights
Male literary villains
Fictional alcohol abusers